Hugh Meade Alcorn Jr. (October 20, 1907 – January 13, 1992) was a U.S. lawyer and political figure. He was a native of Suffield, Connecticut.

Biography
He was born on October 20, 1907 to Cora Terry (Wells) and Hugh Meade Alcorn Sr.

He attended Dartmouth College and Yale Law School. An attorney, he was a partner in the once-prominent Connecticut law firm Tyler, Cooper & Alcorn.

Alcorn was a key figure in Connecticut politics following World War II. He served as State Representative, Republican floor leader, and then Speaker of the Connecticut House of Representatives. He also served as Hartford State's Attorney. As the Republican leader in the Connecticut General Assembly, he was often paired against John Bailey, his legendary Democratic counterpart.

Alcorn joined the Republican National Committee in 1953, and was the chairman of the Republican National Committee between 1957 and 1959, during the presidency of Dwight Eisenhower. He was also the great-great nephew of U.S. Senator and Governor of Mississippi James Lusk Alcorn.

He died of a stroke on January 13, 1992.

Personal life 
Alcorn was married to Marcia Powell Alcorn after the death of his first wife, Janet. He had only one daughter, named Eileen. His brother Howard Alcorn was chief justice of the Connecticut Supreme Court.

References

External links
Hugh Mead (sic) Alcorn entry at The Political Graveyard

 The Papers of Hugh Meade Alcorn at Dartmouth College Library

1907 births
1992 deaths
20th-century American politicians
Connecticut lawyers
Dartmouth College alumni missing graduation year
Republican Party members of the Connecticut House of Representatives
People from Suffield, Connecticut
Republican National Committee chairs
Yale Law School alumni
20th-century American lawyers